"Forget Me Not" is a song that was recorded by Vera Lynn in 1952. It peaked at number five on the UK Singles Chart.

1952 singles
1952 songs
Vera Lynn songs
Song articles with missing songwriters